"Memories to Burn" is a song written by Warren Robb and Dave Kirby, and recorded by American country music artist Gene Watson.  It was released in October 1985 as the second single and title track from the album Memories to Burn.  The song reached #5 on the Billboard  Hot Country Singles & Tracks chart.

Chart performance

References

1986 singles
1985 songs
Gene Watson songs
Epic Records singles